Cardrona railway station served the village of Cardrona, Scottish Borders, Scotland from 1864 to 1962 on the Peebles Railway.

History 
The station opened on 1 October 1864 by the Peebles Railway.

It was situated on the south side of an unnamed minor road with the station goods siding to the south.

A Board of Trade inspector visited the station prior to opening to say that the facilities needed improving. Nothing was done at the time but a new signal box was opened to the west end of the platform in 1895. This controlled access to the goods yard, which comprised one siding running behind the platform and a second short siding acting as a head shunt serving a short cattle dock. Cardrona was the only station beside Rosslynlee Hospital Halt on the line to survive until the closure of the line which was not fitted with totem name signs.

The station was host to a LNER camping coach from 1935 to 1939 and possibly one for some of 1934.

It closed to both passengers and goods traffic on 5 February 1962.

The station building is now used as a shop and the platform survives along with the signal box.

References

External links 
 Cardrona station at Disused Stations

Disused railway stations in the Scottish Borders
Former North British Railway stations
Railway stations in Great Britain opened in 1864
Railway stations in Great Britain closed in 1962
1864 establishments in Scotland
1962 disestablishments in Scotland